Roseville Plantation is a historic home located near Florence, Florence County, South Carolina.  It was built about 1885 and renovated about 1910.  It is a two-story, lateral gabled, weatherboard-clad residence.  The building consists partly of mortise and tenoned hand-hewn and peeled log construction.  It was built on the foundations of the original plantation house built about 1835.  The house at Roseville Plantation is at the end of a tree lined dirt driveway and set at the center of a broad sparsely landscaped lawn, resting upon a brick pier foundation which has recently been enclosed at its perimeter with stuccoed concrete block.  It features a broad, one-story, hip roofed wraparound veranda.

It was listed on the National Register of Historic Places in 1997.

References

Houses on the National Register of Historic Places in South Carolina
Houses completed in 1885
Houses in Florence County, South Carolina
National Register of Historic Places in Florence County, South Carolina
Buildings and structures in Florence, South Carolina